Amis publics is a 2016 French comedy film directed by Edouard Pluvieux.

Plot
To make the dream of his young sick brother come true, Leo and his best friends, Franck and Lounès, organize a fake robbery. However, they hold up the wrong bank, where the fake robbery becomes real.

Cast and characters
 Kev Adams as Léo Perez
 Paul Bartel as Ben Perez
 Chloé Coulloud as Ana
 Vincent Elbaz as Bartoloméo
 John Eledjam as Franck
 Majid Berhila as Lounès
 Guy Lecluyse as Bruno
 Frank Bellocq as Eric
 Rebecca Azan as Stéphanie
 Malonn Lévana as Emilie
 Chems Tricot as Max
 Marc Wilhelm as Vincent
 Louise Chabat as Elise
 Nicolas Gabion as Jean-Louis
 Jina Djemba as Myriam
 Thérèse Roussel as Huguette
 Francine Lorin-Blazquez as Sylvie
 Anne Suarez as the commissioner

References

External links
 

2016 films
French comedy films
2010s French-language films
2016 comedy films
Films set in Lyon
Films shot in Lyon
2016 directorial debut films
2010s French films